Jem Alan Cohen (born 1962) is an Afghan-born American filmmaker based in New York City. Cohen is especially known for his observational portraits of urban landscapes, blending of media formats (sixteen-millimetre, Super 8, videotape) and collaborations with musicians. He is the recipient of the Independent Spirit Award for feature filmmaking. "Cohen's films have been broadcast in Europe by the BBC and ZDF/ARTE, and in the United States by the Sundance Channel and P.B.S. They are in the collections of the Museum of Modern Art, The Whitney, The National Gallery of Art, and Melbourne's Screen Gallery." 
He also makes multichannel installations and still photographs and had a photography show at Robert Miller Gallery in 2009. 
He has received grants from the Guggenheim, Creative Capital, Rockefeller and Alpert Foundations, the National Endowment for the Arts, and other organizations.

Early life
Cohen was born in Kabul, Afghanistan where his father was working for Columbia University, Teachers College and the United States Agency for International Development (U.S.A.I.D.). He graduated from Wesleyan University in 1984, with a concentration in film and photography.

Career
Cohen found the mainstream Hollywood film industry incompatible with his sociopolitical and artistic views. By applying the D.I.Y. ethos of Punk Rock to his film-making approach, he crafted a distinct style in his films through various small gauge formats of Super 8, sixteen-millimetre, and videotape. In an interview with web-site The Lamp, Cohen said, "...it's very inspiring to me, to see people kind of take something outside of the industry, outside of the music industry, and it gave me something of a template to work in film outside of the film industry. And there are certainly strains of punk that are activist and that are kind of oppositional in nature to the dominant mainstream culture... that's very inspiring to me..."

Cohen's longer works include his feature film, Museum Hours, Chain, and the experimental documentary, Instrument, a portrait of the D.C. punk band Fugazi that was ten years in the making. Benjamin Smoke, about the life of the frontman of the Atlanta, Georgia band Smoke, covers a ten-year arc. Other works of note are Lost Book Found, his Walter Benjamin-inspired portrait of New York City, Buried in Light, a series of connected Central and Eastern European city portraits, and his short film about the late Elliott Smith, Lucky Three. In 2002, Cohen made Chain X Three, a precursor to the Chain feature film, which was exhibited as a three-channel installation. His concert film of the Dutch band The Ex, Building a Broken Mousetrap, premiered at the Toronto Film Festival in 2006.

Cohen was a resident at Eyebeam in 2002.

In 2005, Cohen curated the four-day FUSEBOX Festival in Ghent, Belgium. A celebratory gathering "at the crossroads of film, music, and activism," participants included Guy Picciotto of Fugazi, Patti Smith and Tom Verlaine, The Evens, and a side project of Montreal's Thee Silver Mt. Zion Memorial Orchestra & Tra-La-La Band, called Thee Silver Mountain Elegies Play War Radio, which formed for the occasion.

Other music artists Cohen has collaborated with over the years include Patti Smith, Godspeed You Black Emperor!, Vic Chesnutt,  Terry Riley, Sparklehorse, R.E.M., Xylouris White, Jessica Moss, Matana Roberts, T.Griffin, Stephen Vitiello, Miracle Legion, DJ /rupture, Blonde Redhead, and The Ex.

He has also cited that he has previously worked for the film industry as a technician and  prop man, some of the directors he has worked under include Alex Cox, John Sayles, and Martin Scorsese.

Photographer Sid Grossman had been married to Cohen's mother. Grossman was the father of his (half) brother Adam, also a
filmmaker.

Filmography

 A Road in Florida (1983)
 Witness (1986)
 This Is a History of New York (The Golden Age of Reason) (1987)
 Selected City Films (1989)
 Talk About the Passion (1989) collaboration with R.E.M.
 You're the One Lee (1989) collaboration with Miracle Legion
 Glue Man (1989) collaboration with Fugazi
 Light Years (1989)
 Love Teller (1989) collaboration with Ben Katchor
 Never Change (1988) text by Blake Nelson
 4:44 (from her house) (1989)
 What does Away Mean? PSA (1989)
 Marks Town (1991)
 Drink Deep (1991)
 Black Hole Radio (1992) single channel version and video installation
 Nightswimming (1993)
 Drift (1993)
 Buried in Light (1993)
 Sun Project (1994)
 Coney Island End of God the Way It Must Be (1996)
 Lost Book Found (1996)
 Lucky Three (1997)
 Amber City (1999)
 Instrument (1999)
 Blood Orange Sky (1999)
 Waterfront Diaries (New York) (2000)
 Nice Evening, Transmission Down (2001)
 Little Flags (2000)
 Benjamin Smoke (2000)
 George Thief (2002)
 The Foxx and Little Vic (2002)
 Cat Power: Live from Fur City (2002)
 Chain X Three (2002)
 Chain (2004)
 NYC Weights and Measures (2005)
 Blessed Are the Dreams of Men (2006)
 Building a Broken Mouse Trap (2006)
 Free (2007)
 Spirit (2007)
 Empires of Tin (2007)
 Long for the City (2008)
 Half the Battle (2008)
 The Passage Clock (For Walter Benjamin) (2008)
 Anne Truitt, Working (2009)
 Night Scene New York (2009,
 Le Bled (Buildings in a Field) (2009) with writer Luc Sante
 One Bright Day (2009)
 Crossing Paths With Luce Vigo (2010)
 Gravity Hill NEWSREELS (2011/12)
 Museum Hours (2012)
 We Have an Anchor (2015)
 Counting (2015)

References

External links
 
  Jem Cohen's website
  Jem Cohen's Creative Capital Profile
 Just Hold Still; A Conversation with Jem Cohen
 Jem Cohen in the Video Data Bank
 Jem Cohen, Lost Book Found
 Interview with Indiewire
 "Free" video
 Benjamin Smoke
 An interview with Jem Cohen, director of Museum Hours:"Art is something people do like breathing.", with David Walsh on the World Socialist Web Site
 Jem Cohen's BOMB interview by J.P. Sniadecki

1962 births
American documentary filmmakers
American experimental filmmakers
American film directors
Jewish American artists
Wesleyan University alumni
Living people
21st-century American Jews